In music, Op. 65 stands for Opus number 65. Compositions that are assigned this number include:

 Brahms – Neue Liebeslieder
 Britten – Cello Sonata
 Chopin – Cello Sonata
 Dvořák – Piano Trio No. 3
 Glazunov – Commemorative Cantata for the Centenary of the Birth of Pushkin
 Koechlin – Les Heures persanes
 Mendelssohn – Organ Sonatas, Op. 65
 Reger – Zwölf Stücke, Op. 65
 Saint-Saëns – Septet in E major
 Schumann – Ritornelle in canonischen Weisen (7 canonic part songs)
 Shostakovich – Symphony No. 8
 Strauss – Die Frau ohne Schatten
 Weber – Invitation to the Dance